Argens-Minervois is a commune in the Aude department in the Occitanie region of southern France.

The inhabitants of the commune are known as Argenais or Argenaises

Geography
Argens-Minervois is located some 20 km west by south-west of Capestang and 6 km north of Lézignan-Corbières. The northern border of the commune is also the border between Aude and Hérault. Access to the commune is by the D124 road from Roubia in the east which passes through the village and continues along the bank of the Canal du Midi to join the D11 north-east of the commune. The commune is forested in the north with a large reservoir in the centre feeding the Canal du-Midi. The rest of the commune is farmland.

The Aude river forms the whole southern and western border of the commune with the Canal du Midi parallel to it in the commune on the left bank in the commune. The large reservoir in the centre of the commune feeds the Canal through the Ruisseau de l'Étang on the eastern side and an unnamed stream on the western side. The Ruisseau du Four rises in the north-east of the commune and flows under the Canal to the Aude.

Neighbouring communes and villages

History

Heraldry

Administration

List of Successive Mayors

Demography
In 2017 the commune had 347 inhabitants.

Economy
Viticulture: Minervois (AOC), Languedoc (AOC)

Sites and monuments
Argens Locks
A Château from the 14th century
A Medieval Village
The Church of Saint-Vincent contains two items that are registered as historical objects:
A Bronze Ball (1607)
A Baptismal font

See also
Communes of the Aude department

References

External links
Argens-Minervois on the National Geographic Institute website 
Argens-Minervois on Géoportail, National Geographic Institute (IGN) website 
Argens on the 1750 Cassini Map

Communes of Aude